The 2016–17 Surinamese Cup (Beker van Suriname) is the 20th edition of the cup competition in Suriname. 32 teams from the top 3 leagues in the country will participate.

First round
Matches are played between 6. January and 15. January 
S.V. Nishan 42 – S.C.S. Randjiet Boys 
S.V. Transvaal – Inter Boskamp 
ACoconut – Rica Prof 
S.V. Voorwaarts – S.C.S.V. Bomastar
S.V. Jong Rambaan – OSV 
Sportvereniging Nationaal Leger – Kitha 
S.V. Caravan – Slee Jr. 
S.V. Papatam – Bintang Lair 
S.V. Botopasi – Paraguay 
Inter Moengotapoe – Sunny Point 
F.C. West United – TOK 
S.V. Notch – S.V. Santos 
S.V. Leo Victor – BSV 
WBC – Marcon 
P.V.V. – Tahiti 
S.V. Robinhood – Flora

Round 1
January 7
Rica Prof         0-1 ACoconut          
Boma Star         1-1 Voorwaarts        [4-3 pen]
Kitha             1-8 SNL               
Slee Jr.          6-2 Caravan           
Bintang Lair      0-2 Papatam           [abandoned at 0-2 in 2nd half after 4 red cards against Bintang Lair]
Tahiti            1-2 PVV

January 8
OSV               1-5 Jong Rambaan      

January 13
Flora             0-2 Robinhood         

January 14
Randjiet Boys     0-4 Nishan 42         
Paraguay          0-6 Botopasi          [abandoned at 0-6 in 60' when Paraguay were left with 7 players]
Sunny Point       1-3 Inter Moengotapoe
TOK               1-1 West United       [TOK on pen]
Santos            3-0 Notch             
BSV               1-1 Leo Victor        [Leo Victor on pen]
Marcon            0-3 WBC               
Inter Boskamp     0-6 Transvaal

Round 2
March 3
Nishan 42         4-0 Boma Star         
PVV               3-2 Transvaal         

March 4
Santos            3-2 Botopasi          
Leo Victor        5-1 Slee Jr.          

March 5
WBC               2-1 SNL               
Robinhood         0-2 Inter Moengotapoe 

March 25
TOK               1-2 Papatam           
ACoconut          3-1 Jong Rambaan

Quarterfinals
April 23
Santos            2-0 PVV               
Papatam           4-0 ACoconut          

April 26
WBC               2-2 Leo Victor        [WBC on pen (no extra time)]
Nishan 42         2-2 Inter Moengotapoe [3-4 pen (no extra time)]

Semifinals
May 31
Inter Moengotapoe 6-0 Santos            
Papatam           3-2 WBC

Final
June 30, André Kamperveenstadion, Paramaribo
Inter Moengotapoe 3-3 Papatam           [aet, 4-3 pen]

References 

 

SVB Cup
1
Surinam